Andreas Scherer is a West Germany and later German former ski jumper.

References

1969 births
Living people
German male ski jumpers
Place of birth missing (living people)
20th-century German people